Hodoš railway station serves the municipality of Hodoš, Slovenia.  It was opened in 1907, and is the last station on the line from Ormož, Slovenia, before the border crossing between Slovenia and Hungary.

The portion of the Ormož–Hodoš line between Murska Sobota and Hodoš was closed in 1968, along with many similar line closures elsewhere in Slovenia. However, in 1999-2001 the line was rebuilt, in a less winding form, as part of one of the new European transit corridors.

Since the completion of the rebuilding work, Hodoš railway station has been the shared border station on the only railway line crossing the border between Slovenia and Hungary.

References

External links 
Official site of the Slovenian railways 

Railway stations in Slovenia
Railway stations opened in 1907